Lee and Li, Attorneys-at-Law is a law firm headquartered in Taipei, Taiwan. Founded in 1965 by James Lee and C. N. Li, the firm has offices in Taipei, Hsinchu, Taichung, and southern Taiwan, with strategic alliances in Beijing and Shanghai. Lee and Li exists to care, serve, and excel. To achieve sustainable operations, it brings together distinguished professionals and creates a platform to share experience, prize innovation and value teamwork.

Practices
 Banking and Finance/Capital Markets/Insurance
 Corporate and Investment/Mergers and Acquisitions - Non-Financial Institutions and Financial Institutions/Tax/Labor/Food & Medical/Competition Laws/Real Estate and Construction/Government Contracts/Digital, TMT and Data Privacy
 Civil Dispute Resolution/Criminal Dispute Representation and Defense/Public Law Dispute Resolution/Environmental Law/Energy Law/Family heritage plan and family affairs/International Trade
 Patent Enforcement, Trade Secret Protection And Dispute Resolution/Patent Prosecution and Maintenance/Patent Drafting and Global Patent Protection/Patent Search, Patent Validity And Infringement Assessment
 Trademark/Copyrights Enforcement, Maintenance and Dispute Resolution/Trademark Dispute Resolutions/Global Trademark/Copyright Protection 
 P.R.C. Practice
 Japanese Practice Department

Notable people
Chen Changwen, former secretary of the Straits Exchange Foundation and president of the Red Cross Society of the Republic of China.

References

External links
Lee and Li website

Law firms established in 1953
Law firms of Taiwan
1953 establishments in Taiwan